Ulmus harbinensis Nie & Huang, also known as the Harbin elm, is a small elm found only in the province of Heilongjang in the northeastern extremity of China, where it occurs in mixed forest.

Description
A robust, sturdy tree which can reach a height of < 15 m, with a slender trunk of 0.3 m d.b.h. The bark is irregularly but finely fissured. The wing-less glabrous branchlets bear small, obovate, coarsely pubescent leaves < 5.5 cm long by 3.5 cm broad. The wind-pollinated apetalous flowers appear in April; the generally orbicular samarae in June.

Pests and diseases
No information available.

Cultivation
The tree is very rare in cultivation.

References

Elm species and varieties
Flora of China
Trees of China
Trees of Asia
Ulmus articles missing images
harbinensis